"Crush" is a song by American singer and actress Mandy Moore from her second studio album, Mandy Moore (2001). It was the album's second single, following "In My Pocket". Released in September 2001, it peaked at number 35 on the US Billboard Mainstream Top 40 chart and at number 25 in Australia.

Commercial performance
In the United States, "Crush" did not enter the Billboard Hot 100 but appeared on the Billboard Mainstream Top 40 chart, debuting at number 35 and spending five weeks on the chart. In Australia, "Crush" debuted and peaked at number 25 on the ARIA Singles Chart, becoming Moore's fifth single to enter the chart. It left the chart from number 49, spending a total of seven weeks in the top 50.

Music video
The song's music video ends with Moore wearing a replica of the jacket Michael Jackson wears in the "Thriller" music video.

Track listing
Australian CD single
 "Crush" (remix)
 "Crush" (album version)
 "In My Pocket" (Brandnew remix)
 Album mix tape

Charts

References

2001 singles
2001 songs
Epic Records singles
Mandy Moore songs
Songs written by Kenny Gioia
Songs written by Shep Goodman